Juan Joseph (August 26, 1987 – November 16, 2014) was a professional Arena football quarterback who also played American and Canadian football. He last played for the Lafayette Wildcatters of the Southern Indoor Football League (SIFL). He was signed by the Edmonton Eskimos as an undrafted free agent in 2009. He played college football for the Millsaps Majors. He was also a member of the Saskatchewan Roughriders.

Early years
Joseph attended West Saint John Parish High School in Edgard, Louisiana, where he was a member of the Rams 2003 and 2004 Class 2A State Championship teams. While in high school, he was a teammate of future LSU and NFL players Tyson Jackson and Quinn Johnson. In high school, he played baseball, basketball and football, trying out for the football team in his sophomore year.

College career
Joseph played collegiately for the Millsaps College Majors of the NCAA's Division III. He was offered a full scholarship at Alcorn State University, but chose Millsaps because he wanted to attain a degree from a school with a nationally recognized business program.

In 2005, his first year at Millsaps, Joseph split playing time as a backup quarterback. The Majors finished 2–7 on the year.

As a sophomore in 2006, Joseph led a resurgence of the Majors' struggling program, under the tutelage of new head coach Mike DuBose, formerly the head coach of the Alabama Crimson Tide. The Majors finished with a 7–4 record (6–0 in conference play), claiming the program's third SCAC title and second-ever playoff berth. Joseph was named the conference's player of the year.

In 2007, Joseph again led the Majors to a SCAC title, the team finishing with an 8–2 record. He was again named the conference's player of the year.

As a senior in 2008, Joseph led the Majors to the second best season in the program's history. The team finished 11–1 and ranked #12 nationally in the D3football.com poll, after peaking at #3 during the season. Joseph was for the third consecutive year the SCAC player of the year. He also won the Conerly Trophy, given annually to the best college football player in the state of Mississippi, edging out fellow finalists and future first-round NFL Draft selections Michael Oher and Peria Jerry. He was also a finalist for the Gagliardi Trophy.

Joseph played in 38 games for the Majors from 2005 to 2008, amassing 9,295 passing yards (244.6/game) and 87 passing touchdowns (2.3/game) compared to 27 interceptions, and completing 814 of 1,283 pass attempts (63.4%). He also rushed for 537 yards and 8 touchdowns on 161 attempts. During his tenure, the Majors accumulated a 28–14 overall win–loss record, including a 20–6 record in conference play, three SCAC title's and two playoff appearances. Joseph's priority while at college was not to play professionally.  A good student, he admitted it would be nice, but this was not one of his goals.

Collegiate statistics

Professional career

Edmonton Eskimos
Joseph was signed by the Edmonton Eskimos in March 2009.

Saskatchewan Roughriders
Joseph was traded to the Saskatchewan Roughriders for Kitwana Jones on May 15, 2009. He was cut on June 25, 2009.

Lafayette Wildcatters
Joseph joined the Lafayette Wildcatters two days prior to the start of the 2010 SIFL season. The team began the year 1–4 before Joseph became the starter. With Joseph at the helm, the team soared to a 5–1 turnaround, achieving a winning season and a playoff berth.

Death
In the early morning hours of November 16, 2014, Joseph attempted to de-escalate a verbal altercation between two groups of men outside of the Allure nightclub in Baton Rouge, Louisiana. Joseph's efforts were unsuccessful, and he was shot twice in the torso. He succumbed to his injuries after being taken to nearby Baton Rouge Hospital. Before his death, Joseph was an assistant football coach at West St. John High School in Edgard, Louisiana.

Family
Joseph was married with a young daughter and a second child due just weeks after his death. His younger brother, Dray Joseph, was also a quarterback at West Saint John, and played collegiately for Southern University, where he became the school's all-time leading passer with 8,745 yards and 73 touchdowns, and led the Jaguars to a 9–4 record and a SWAC championship as a senior in 2013.

References

1987 births
2014 deaths
American football quarterbacks
Canadian football quarterbacks
Millsaps Majors football players
Edmonton Elks players
Saskatchewan Roughriders players
High school football coaches in Louisiana
People from Jefferson Parish, Louisiana
People from Edgard, Louisiana
Players of American football from Louisiana
African-American coaches of American football
African-American players of American football
African-American players of Canadian football
Deaths by firearm in Louisiana
People murdered in Louisiana
20th-century African-American people
21st-century African-American sportspeople
Murdered African-American people
Male murder victims